Yuxi railway station is a railway station located in the county-level city of Fuqing, Fuzhou, Fujian Province, China, on the Fuzhou–Xiamen Railway operated by the Nanchang Railway Bureau, China Railway Corporation.

Construction
Currently this station has not yet been constructed. Conditions for construction have been reserved.

References 

Railway stations in Fujian